Minor Ventures was a venture capital firm that backs early-stage tech and media companies. The company was founded in 2005 by CNET co-founder Halsey Minor and run by Ron Palmeri from its founding until August 2010.  The firm was based in San Francisco, California.

Investments
As of December 2007, Minor Ventures had assisted the following companies:

 8020 Publishing — Produces the hybrid web-print magazines JPG and Everywhere.
 GrandCentral — A web-based service allowing users to use a single phone number with multiple devices; acquired by Google in July 2007, relaunched in March 2009 as Google Voice.
 Kareo — A web-based billing service for physicians.
 Minor Studios — A currently defunct creative studio responsible for the game Atmosphir.
 OpenDNS — A free DNS service provider.
 Paxfire — An ad revenue service for ISPs.
 Swivel — An online community for sharing data, graphs, and maps.
 Scout Labs — A social media monitoring & analysis service launched in February 2009.

References

External links
 Minor Ventures

Financial services companies established in 2005
Companies based in San Francisco
Venture capital firms of the United States